Ugo Sivocci (August 29, 1885 - September 8, 1923) was an Italian race car driver.

Born in Salerno, Sivocci started his racing career as one of the pioneers of Italian bicycle racing, obtaining a second place in the 600 km long classic Corsa Nazionale. After World War I, he worked as an auto mechanic in Milan. Being a friend of Enzo Ferrari, he was hired by Alfa Romeo in 1920 to drive Alfa in three-man works team: (Alfa Corse) with Antonio Ascari and Enzo Ferrari. With the HP 20-30 ES Sport  he finished 2nd in the Parma - Poggio Berceto race. In 1923 he began to drive the Alfa Romeo RL, and quickly won numerous races. In the same year, he won the Targa Florio with RL Targa Florio which was his major racing achievement. The race was a great success for Alfa Romeo as second (Ascari) and fourth places (Giulio Masetti)
were occupied by Alfa. Sivocci's car was painted with the green cloverleaf  on a white background that was to become Alfa's good luck token.

In the same year Sivocci was killed while testing Merosi's new P1 at Monza. On the same day of the accident, a press release of the engineer Nicola Romeo announced the withdrawal of other Alfa Romeo cars competing.

His car was carrying number 17, which was never again assigned to Italian racing cars.

Major results
Parma - Poggio Berceto race 1921, 2nd
Circuit of Mugello 1921, 4th
Targa Florio 1922, 9th
Targa Florio 1923, 1st

Major cycling results
Corsa Nazionale 1902, 12th
Corsa Nazionale 1904, 2nd

References

External links
Ugo Sivocci biography (Italian)
Tutta la storia di Ugo Sivocci (ITA-ENG)

1885 births
1923 deaths
People from Salerno
Italian racing drivers
Racing drivers who died while racing
Sport deaths in Italy
Sportspeople from the Province of Salerno